Kiyochi Ogata (died August 1, 1944) was a colonel in the Imperial Japanese Army during World War II. He committed seppuku after the Battle of Tinian.

Biography 

Kiyochi Ogata was the commanding officer of Tinian, one of the Pacific Islands. He commanded 4,500 soldiers on the island, while the other troops were commanded either by the commander of the four airfields on Tinian, Captain Goichi Oie, or the commander of the naval forces stationed there, Vice Admiral Kakuji Kakuta. Fortunately for the Japanese, the 50th Division arrived on the island after leaving Manchukuo. But when the United States invaded Tinian, Ogata's defenses were poor and the US troops made it onto the beaches without extensive resistance. He failed a counterattack, and was forced into the inner parts of the island. The Japanese were defeated in the battle, and Ogata and Oie committed ritual suicide.

References 

 Brooks, Victor: Hell is Upon Us: D-Day in the Pacific, 2005 pp. 234–260

1944 deaths
Japanese military personnel who committed suicide
Japanese military personnel of World War II
Year of birth missing
Japanese Army officers
Japanese military personnel killed in World War II